The following is a list of notable events and releases of the year 1994 in Norwegian music.

Events

March
 25 – The 21st Vossajazz started in Voss, Norway (March 25 – 27).

May
 26 – The 22nd Nattjazz started in Bergen, Norway (May 26 – June 5).

June
 11 – The Norwegian Wood Festival started in Oslo, Norway.
 29 – The 25th Kalvøyafestivalen started at Kalvøya near by Oslo.

July
 18 – The 34th Moldejazz started in Molde, Norway (July 18 – 23).

Albums released

Unknown date

A
 Arild Andersen
 Arv (Kirkelig Kulturverksted)

B
 Jon Balke
 Further (ECM Records), with the Magnetic North Orchestra

Deaths

 January
 7 – Øistein Sommerfeldt, composer (born 1919).
 30 – Finn Arnestad, jazz trumpeter (born 1915).

 April
 2 – Rowland Greenberg, jazz trumpeter (born 1920).

 May
 18 – Hans Stenseth, flautist and flute teacher (born 1896).

 September
 9 – Soffi Schønning, operatic soprano (born 1895).

 October
 31 – Erling Stordahl, farmer and singer (born 1923).

Births

 April
 9 – Jo David Meyer Lysne, jazzguitarist and composer.
 12 – Julie Bergan, singer and songwriter.

 May
 3 – Signe Førre, jazz singer, upright bassist, and composer.
 11 – Guro Kleven Hagen, classical violinist and 1st concert master at the Opera Orchestra by Norwegian National Opera and Ballet.

 July
 4 – Agnete Johnsen, singer and songwriter.

 Unknown date
 Amalie Holt Kleive, jazz singer and composer.

See also
 1994 in Norway
 Music of Norway
 Norway in the Eurovision Song Contest 1994

References

 
Norwegian music
Norwegian
Music
1990s in Norwegian music